Michelle Banga Moundzoula (born November 30, 1987) is a track and field athlete from the Republic of the Congo.

Moundzoula competed for Congo at the 2004 Summer Olympics in the Women's 200 metres. Competing in the fifth heat, Moudzoula finished last with a time of 24.37 seconds.

References

External links

Yahoo! Sports profile

1987 births
Living people
Republic of the Congo female sprinters
Athletes (track and field) at the 2004 Summer Olympics
Olympic athletes of the Republic of the Congo